Oleg Vitalyevich Maltsev (born 19 November 1967, in Omsk) is a Russian judoka, medalist of the CIS Championship, champion and medalist of the championships of Russia and Europe, medalist of the world championship, Honored Master of Sports of Russia. He competed at the 1992 Summer Olympics and the 1996 Summer Olympics.

Achievements

References

External links
 

1967 births
Living people
Russian male judoka
Judoka at the 1992 Summer Olympics
Judoka at the 1996 Summer Olympics
Olympic judoka of the Unified Team
Olympic judoka of Russia
Sportspeople from Omsk
20th-century Russian people
21st-century Russian people